David Owen (born February 14, 1955) is an American journalist and author.

Education
David Owen grew up in Kansas City, Missouri, and graduated from The Pembroke-Country Day School in 1973. He attended Colorado College before transferring to Harvard University, where he was an editor of The Harvard Lampoon, as was his future wife, Ann Hodgman. He graduated from Harvard in 1978 with a degree in English.

Journalism
Owen has been a staff writer for The New Yorker since 1991 and a contributing editor of Golf Digest since 1995; previously he was a contributing editor of The Atlantic Monthly and a senior writer for Harper's Magazine. For six years he was a regular columnist for Home magazine. He was also a contributing editor and columnist for Spy.

Owen won an Alicia Patterson Journalism Fellowship in 1984 to research and write about standardized testing in the American education system.

Personal life
Owen lives in Washington, Connecticut with his wife, Ann Hodgman. They have two adult children, both writers: Laura Hazard Owen and John Bailey Owen.

Works

Books
 High School: Undercover with the Class of '80 (New York: Viking, 1981) 
 None of the Above: Behind the Myth of Scholastic Aptitude (pb. subtitle: The Truth Behind the SATs (New YorkL Houghton Mifflin Company, 1985)  
 The Man Who Invented Saturday Morning: And Other Adventures in American Enterprise (Villard, 1988)  
 The Walls Around Us: The Thinking Person's Guide to How a House Works (New York: Villard, 1991)  
 My Usual Game; Adventures in Golf (New York: Villard, 1995) 
 (co-editor:) Lure of the Links: Great Golf Stories, an Anthology (New York: Atlantic Monthly Press, 1997)  
 Around the House: Reflections on Life Under a Roof (pb. title: Life Under a Leaky Roof) (New York Villard, 1998)  
 The Complete Office Golf (New York: Workman Publishing, 1999)  
 The Making of the Masters: Clifford Roberts, Augusta National, and Golf's Most Prestigious Tournament (New York: Simon & Schuster, 1999) 
 The Chosen One: Tiger Woods and the Dilemma of Greatness (New York: Simon & Schuster, 2001)  
 Hit & Hope: How the Rest of Us Play Golf (New York: Simon & Schuster, 2003) 
 The First National Bank of Dad: The Best Way to Teach Kids About Money (pb. subtitle: A Foolproof Method for Teaching Your Kids the Value of Money) (New York: Simon & Schuster, 2003)  
 Copies in Seconds: How a Lone Inventor and an Unknown Company Created the Biggest Communication Breakthrough Since Gutenberg – Chester Carlson and the Birth of Xerox (New York: Simon & Schuster, 2004)  
 Sheetrock and Shellac: A Thinking Person's Guide to the Art and Science of Home Improvement (New York: Simon & Schuster, 2006)  
 Green Metropolis: Why Living Smaller, Living Closer, and Driving Less Are the Keys to Sustainability (New York: Riverhead, 2009) 
 The Conundrum: How Scientific Innovation, Increased Efficiency, and Good Intentions Can Make our Energy and Climate Problems Worse (New York: Riverhead, 2012) 

Essays and reporting
 "Those Who Can't, Consult," Harper's, August 1982,
 "Where Toys Come From," The Atlantic Monthly, October 1986,
 "Travel: Innocents Abroad – Making Britain fun for a child can be fun for a parent, too,"" The Atlantic Monthly, November 1996
 "Notes & Comment: Children and Money – Training a little investor," The Atlantic Monthly, April 1998 
 "Life and Letters: From Race to Chase – Yale’s Stephen L. Carter writes a thriller," The New Yorker, June 3, 2002
 "Books: Measure for Measure – How the metric system conquered the world-almost," The New Yorker, October 14, 2002
 "Mom and Pop Dept.: The Hundred Club," The New Yorker, December 23, 2002
 "NASA, Spinning: Was the space shuttle useful? Not really." Slate, posted February 4, 2003
 "The Case for All Male Golf Clubs" Golf Digest, March 2003 
 "Shouts & Murmurs: Remake" (plot outline for 2003 remake of It's a Wonderful Life), The New Yorker, April 21, 2003
 "Dept. of Procurement: The Meat Doctor," The New Yorker, June 30, 2003
 "Shouts & Murmurs: A Naturalist’s Notes," The New Yorker, August 11, 2003
 "Shouts & Murmurs: 8 Simple Rules For Dating My Ex-Wife," The New Yorker, January 12, 2004
 "Hey Pal Dept.: Old Hack," The New Yorker, January 26, 2004
 "Our Local Correspondents: Green Manhattan," The New Yorker, October 18, 2004 
 "Shouts & Murmurs: Your Three Wishes – F.A.Q.," The New Yorker, January 16, 2006 
 "Pencils Up! The S.A.T.’s Watchdog," The New Yorker, April 3, 2006 
 "Annals of Culture: The Soundtrack of Your Life – Muzak in the realm of retail theatre," The New Yorker, April 10, 2006
 "Precocity Dept.: Bird," The New Yorker, July 24, 2006
 "Shouts & Murmurs: The Afterlife – Cutting Back," The New Yorker, January 7, 2008
 "Talk of the Town: Here to There Dept.: Wheeling" The New Yorker, December 1, 2008
 "The Talk of the Town: Here to There Dept.: Tornado Man" The New Yorker, November 1, 2010
 "Annals of Health: Hands across America: The Rise of Purell" The New Yorker, March 4, 2013
 "Annals of Disaster: Notes from Underground: Florida's sinkhole peril The New Yorker, March 18, 2013
 "The Yips," The New Yorker'', May 26, 2014

References

External links
 Archive of contributions to The New Yorker
 David Owen's website
 David Owen's golf website
 

1955 births
Living people
The Harvard Lampoon alumni
People from Washington, Connecticut
The New Yorker staff writers
Writers from Kansas City, Missouri
Journalists from Connecticut
Journalists from Missouri
20th-century American journalists
20th-century American non-fiction writers
20th-century American male writers
21st-century American journalists
21st-century American non-fiction writers
21st-century American male writers